Samir Barać (born 2 November 1973 in Rijeka) is a Croatian water polo player who competed in the 2000, 2004, 2008, and 2012 Summer Olympics. As team captain, he was part of the Croatian team that won the gold medal in 2012. He played for VK Primorje Rijeka, POŠK Split, HAVK Mladost Zagreb and Brescia.

See also
 Croatia men's Olympic water polo team records and statistics
 List of Olympic champions in men's water polo
 List of Olympic medalists in water polo (men)
 List of players who have appeared in multiple men's Olympic water polo tournaments
 List of world champions in men's water polo
 List of World Aquatics Championships medalists in water polo

References

External links
 

1973 births
Living people
Sportspeople from Rijeka
Croatian male water polo players
Water polo drivers
Water polo players at the 2000 Summer Olympics
Water polo players at the 2004 Summer Olympics
Water polo players at the 2008 Summer Olympics
Water polo players at the 2012 Summer Olympics
Medalists at the 2012 Summer Olympics
Olympic gold medalists for Croatia in water polo
World Aquatics Championships medalists in water polo
Bosniaks of Croatia
Croatian expatriate sportspeople in Italy
Expatriate water polo players